Østlands-Posten is a local newspaper published in Larvik, Norway. It covers Larvik and Lardal. It was established in 1881.

It has a circulation of 14,284, of whom 13,888 are subscribers.

1896-1995 Østlands-Posten was owned by the Næss family. It is now published by the company A-pressen Lokale Medier AS, which in turn is owned 100% by A-pressen.

References

Norwegian Media Registry

External links

Publications established in 1881
Daily newspapers published in Norway
Mass media in Vestfold
Amedia
1881 establishments in Norway